Mary Fitzpatrick (born 1968 in England) is a photographer. Fitzpatrick is known for her images of spaces abandoned after conflict. In 2004 she exhibited images of post Gulf War Kuwait - 'Failaka' as part of the 'Streets of Desire' Exhibition curated by Jump Ship Rat at the Blade Factory, Greenland street in the Liverpool Biennial Independents. She also took part in the Chobi Mela IV International Photography Festival  in Dhaka at the British Council in 2007.

Fitzpatrick was shortlisted for the Liverpool Art Prize in 2008.

References

External links
 Official Site

1968 births
Living people
Alumni of the University of Central Lancashire
English women photographers
Alumni of Ulster University
21st-century women photographers